Paracha (Urdu: پراچہ, Hindi: पराचा) or Piracha (Urdu: پِراچہ, Hindi: पिराचा), also known as Peracha, Piracha ,Pracha, and Paracha, is a family name in India and Pakistan, most common in the Punjab region.

History 
The Paracha caste is native to the Gandhara region of the Indian subcontinent, with the caste name being of Hindi origin.

The Rawalpindi Gazetteer recorded the principal settlements of the Paracha as being Makhad and Attock, stating that the Paracha were of Hindu origin, as with the Khoja; many Piracha later converted to Islam.

The Gazetteer of the Shahpur District mentioned that the Piracha caste engaged in trade and preferred to record their transactions in Hindi, as with the Khoja.

Today, the Pirachas are scattered all over the world.

Fictional characters
 Kaneez Paracha, a character from Ackley Bridge
 Nasreen Paracha, a character from Ackley Bridge

References

External links 
Dubious ancestors

Social groups of Punjab, Pakistan
Social groups of Punjab, India